The discography for Filipino singer Julie Anne San Jose contains 3 studio albums, 4 compilation albums, 2 EPs, and 22 singles. She is the third and youngest OPM artist to reach the Diamond Record Status for her self-titled debut album Julie Anne San Jose which sold more than 150,000 units in the Philippines. San Jose is also the first ever recipient of the Philippine Association of the Record Industry's (PARI) Platinum Digital Single Award for the outstanding digital sales performance of her carrier single “I’ll Be There” with over 245,000 downloads. San Jose's breakthrough album under new record label Universal Records (Philippines) debuted on the iTunes Chart at the top spot after 30 minutes of its release and stayed there for one week which is a rare feat for OPM albums.

Albums

Studio albums

Compilation albums

Extended plays

Singles

Other appearances

Songwriting credits

Music videos

Soundtracks

Notes

References

Discographies of Filipino artists